Long Beach Plaza was a two-level  shopping mall located in Downtown Long Beach, California. It was designed in the 1970s by The Hahn Company and opened in 1982. The eight-block dumbbell-shaped mall was an enclosed structure and included a two-story deck parking structure on both sides.

The mall was previously anchored by J. C. Penney, Montgomery Ward and Buffums' (which closed in 1991).

Problems with the mall included the fact that the mall structure (which included stores that faced inward) had no connection with the rest of Downtown Long Beach area. The closure of the nearby Naval stations in the 1990s also contributed to the slow demise of the mall. 

In 1999, the mall was purchased by DDR Corp., Coventry Real Estate Partners and Prudential Real Estate as a joint venture. In 2000, the mall was demolished except for the parking structure. DDR eventually rebuilt the area and renamed it Long Beach City Place.

References

External links
Aerial view (scroll down to bottom) accessed 21 August 2006
Interior view

Demolished shopping malls in the United States
Downtown Long Beach
Buildings and structures in Long Beach, California
Shopping malls in the South Bay, Los Angeles
Shopping malls established in 1982
Shopping malls disestablished in 2000
1982 establishments in California
2000 disestablishments in California
Demolished buildings and structures in California
Buildings and structures demolished in 2000